Irish culture in America is widespread though not especially visible as such except on Saint Patrick's Day, when, it is said, "Every American is Irish."

Many Irish began to immigrate after World War I. However,  there was a decline in immigration after U.S. Congress began to limit the numbers of individuals  immigrating. The numbers of Irish immigrants began to increase again after World War II.

Most Irish who came to the United States settled in urban areas. Many of these neighborhoods retain aspects of Irish culture, especially around the local Catholic church.

Words and songs from Ireland have come into common American usage. Common words used in the English language that have Irish origin include galore, hooligan, phony, slob, and whiskey.

Recently, Irish dancing, which has existed in pockets in the U.S., has become popular as a stage performance, with dancers from Ireland touring the United States.

See also
 Irish American
 Scotch-Irish American

References

Further reading

 Rotman, Deborah L. "The fighting Irish: historical archaeology of nineteenth-century Catholic immigrant experiences in South Bend, Indiana." Historical Archaeology 44 (2010): 113-131. online
 Rotman, Deborah L. "Irish-Catholic immigrant life in South Bend, Indiana: refined earthenwares and the 19th-century social worlds of the Midwest." Midcontinental Journal of Archaeology 37.1 (2012): 25-44.